Francesco Basili (31 January 1767 – 27 March 1850) was an Italian composer and conductor. The son of Andrea Basili, he was born in Loreto and died in Rome.

References

1767 births
1850 deaths
Italian classical composers
Italian male classical composers
Italian conductors (music)
Italian male conductors (music)
Italian opera composers
Male opera composers
People from the Province of Ancona